The Newlands horseshoe is a circular walk in the Lake District, incorporating the main peaks surrounding the Newlands Valley.

Standard round

The regular horseshoe covers six peaks, and approximately 9.4 miles or 15.1 kilometers of walking. It includes the fells Catbells,  Maiden Moor,(1687 ft), High Spy (2143 ft), Dale Head (2473 ft), Hindscarth (2385 ft), and Robinson.  The walk may be extended by another five or so miles, and by four more peaks, by including an extra traverse from Knott Rigg to Causey Pike; but the Horseshoe proper - culminating in what Wainwright called “the deep trench confined by Maiden Moor and Hindscarth” - surrounds and encloses Upper Newlands itself.

Wainwright’s version
Wainwright himself favoured a slightly reduced round, beginning at Cat’s Bells but omitting Robinson in favour of a descent via Hindscarth and Scope End. Apart from the beauty of the track itself, the latter descent (in his opinion) “earns full marks because of the lovely views of Newlands directly ahead”.

See also
Coledale horseshoe
Fairfield horseshoe

References

External links 
 www.example.com

Walking in the United Kingdom
Geography of Cumbria
Tourist attractions in Cumbria